The siege of Djibo is an ongoing blockade of the city of Djibo in Burkina Faso by several factions of Jihadist Islamist rebels. The siege began in February 2022, and is part of the Jihadist insurgency in Burkina Faso.

Djibo is located in Burkina Faso's north, an area which is one of the centers of Jihadist rebel activity. Since the start of the Jihadist insurgency in 2015, the city was gradually isolated from the rest of the country as the rebels increased their attacks. From early 2022, the rebels organized a large-scale blockade by first evicting villagers from the territories around Djibo, forcing the refugees to seek shelter in the settlement. They then began to attack the local infrastructure, prevented people from leaving Djibo, and ambushed supply convoys to the city, subjecting its inhabitants to starvation. Though the Burkinabé security forces have been able to occasionally transport new supplies to Djibo, the situation of the encircled population became increasingly difficult as months passed. Negotiations between government representatives and insurgents, aimed at ending the siege peacefully, were sabotaged by pro-government militias.

Background 
Djibo serves as the capital of Soum Province and was originally one of the most important hubs of cattle trade in the Sahel. From the start of the Jihadist insurgency in Burkina Faso in 2015, the area around Djibo was a center for rebel activity. As the fighting escalated, the city was increasingly isolated by rebels. Local officials and security forces were already fearing constant attacks by 2019, and France24 described Djibo as "liv[ing] as though in a state of siege". Insecurity in the area further worsened from November 2021.

As villages in Soum Province became more exposed to rebel attacks, many people fled from the rural areas and sought safety in Djibo. In January 2022, the Burkina Faso Armed Forces launched Operation Laabingol 1 and destroyed several insurgent camps in the north, mostly in Soum Province. In response, the rebels aimed at attacking the 14th Inter-Arms Regiment which is based at Djibo.

Siege 
The siege began on 16 or 17 February 2022. Jihadist forces surrounded the city, preventing locals from leaving as well as supplies from coming into the settlement. The rebels intercepted public transport buses and goods trucks between Bourzanga and Namssiguia, informing the drivers that they would be executed if any of them tried to enter Djibo. They also toured villages around the city, telling the locals to leave within three days. The settlements of Baagadoumba, Baama, Mandali, Sintaou, Firguindi, Djaw djaw, Baakoore, Senobaani, and Inagani were abandoned, and its inhabitants relocated to Djibo, while the population of Ganoua, Sè, Petelthioudi, Pilaadi and Simbè were taken hostage by the jihadists and forbidden from entering the city. Thus, the city's population increased from 60,000 to 200,000–300,000 people. By forcing much of the local population into a very confined area within the city boundaries, the rebels put pressure on the security forces, destroyed the local economy, and made it more difficult for the government to supply Dijbo.

The besieging rebels belong to several groups, including Ansar ul Islam and al-Qaeda-linked JNIM. The rebels maintain the siege by regularly ambushing supply convoys, mining the roads into the city, erecting checkpoints, and destroying the local water infrastructure. By early March, shortages of food and water were already creating a "dire humanitarian situation". The Burkina Faso Air Force bombed jihadists near Djibo from 20 to 22 March, reportedly killing 53. On the other side, the rebels attacked the city in the same month, damaging the local water facilities. Before retreating, the rebel raiders reportedly told the locals that they would inflict a "Ukrainian death" (French: "la mort ukrainienne") on the city, referencing the then-ongoing Siege of Mariupol.

In April, the Burkinabé military junta attempted to organize talks with the rebels to lift the siege. The Emir of Djibo Boubacari Dicko, his advisors and other local dignitaries met with Ansar ul Islam commanders near the town, as the insurgents preferred to negotiate with these individuals rather than regular government officials. Ansar ul Islam demanded that the inhabitants of Djibo close all their bars, stop arrests, and that the men should grow beards and wear short pants in accordance with their Islamist clothing standards. In addition, the city was supposed to become neutral in the insurgency. The emir told the rebels that these demands were difficult to fulfill, though he and the other representatives would try as long as the siege was lifted. Despite the vagueness of this response, Ansar ul Islam leader Jafar Dicko agreed to ease his group's blockade of the city on 20/21 April. The Burkina Faso Armed Forces were thus able to escort a convoy of 100 food trucks to Dijbo. However, the agreement only involved groups not linked to al-Qaeda and the Islamic State; rebel factions belonging to these organizations thus continued their attacks in the area. In addition, the military reportedly tried to prevent free movement out of Djibo, as it feared that locals might smuggle food to the besieging rebels. Abuses committed by the military and pro-government VDP militias against civilians in Djibo ultimately "scuttled the dialogue aiming to lift the blockade on the town". As 20 civilians attempted to leave Djibo, they were murdered by the VDPs. The VDP militiamen, many of whom were not locals, were fiercely opposed to any compromise with the jihadists.

By May, the city was once again mostly cut off from outside aid, and suffered under food and water shortages. On 26 May, an airstrike by the Burkina Faso Air Force killed JNIM commander Tidiane Djibrilou Dicko and ten other militants near Djibo. On 2 June, rebels raided the city and bombarded two local security forces bases, killing a soldier and four VDPs. This attack further demoralized the local population, and when a convoy of traders attempted to leave the city for the south, so many people tried to climb onto their trucks to escape Djibo that the convoy had to be cancelled. In July, the rebels blew up two bridges to Djibo, further hindering any attempts to supply the city by land. In early August, a military convoy to Djibo was struck by a roadside bomb, killing 15 soldiers. At this point, most people in Djibo had access to one meal per day at most, and many had begun resorting to eating tree leaves.

On 5 September, a roadside bomb hit a supply convoy from Bourzanga which was trying to reach Djibo; 35 people were killed and dozens injured. On 26 September, a supply convoy to Djibo was ambushed by JNIM, the ambush killed 26 soldiers, 10 civilians, and left 95 vehicles destroyed. Burkinabé officers requested support by the forces involved in Operation Barkhane, and the French Air Force intervened to save what remained of the beset convoy. This ambush further undermined public confidence in Interim President Paul-Henri Sandaogo Damiba's government, and possibly contributed to his overthrow on 30 September. By early October, Djibo was mainly supplied by humanitarian flights. On 24 October, JNIM insurgents assaulted the 14th Inter-Arms Regiment's base in Djibo, killing at least ten soldiers and wounding 40 more. Security forces stated that the attackers suffered 18 dead. JNIM claimed that it had also freed 67 prisoners during the raid, and captured 400 "light weapons".

By early November, thousands of civilians had fled Djibo. Facing mass starvation and no longer believing that the government could break the siege, they had opted to risk a trek through rebel-held areas. A spokesman for a group of civil society organisations in the Soum Province declared that the "situation is catastrophic in Djibo", referencing that at least 15 people had died of hunger in the city in the month of October. Meanwhile, Burkina Faso's new President, Ibrahim Traoré, visited Djibo, expressing horror at seeing "children who have skin on their bones, the old people who are dying of hunger, the women who can no longer breastfeed because they have nothing left in their breasts". He also used the occasion to laud the 14th Inter-Arms Regiment for their role in defending Djibo. In the same month, army soldiers and VDP militiamen reportedly attacked villages near Djibo and killed local civilians, resulting in calls for an investigation by the Office of the United Nations High Commissioner for Human Rights.

By December, 370,000 people remained besieged in Djibo, with the local civilians forced to exist largely on the consumption of wild leaves. Many had to regularly go hungry for several days before receiving food packages by the government or NGOs. At this point, the Burkinabe government became increasingly critical of certain foreign powers in regards to the Islamist insurgency, blaming France for the situation and accusing Barbara Manzi, United Nations representative for Burkina Faso, of cooperating with the rebels besieging Djibo. In February 2023, the junta demanded that all French forces leave the country; France subsequently terminated its military support mission. Instead, the Burkinabe government declared its intention to seek support from Russia. Meanwhile, conditions in Djibo continued to detoriate.

Notes

References

Conflicts in 2022
Jihadist insurgency in Burkina Faso
Sieges
Soum Province
2022 in Burkina Faso
Battles in 2022
Battles in 2023